Jianning (建宁/建寧) may refer to:

Jianning (168–172), an era name used by Emperor Ling of Han

Places in China
 Jianning County, a county in Fujian
 Jianning Subdistrict, a subdistrict of Lusong District in Zhuzhou, Hunan
 Jianning Township, a township in Gaoping, Shanxi

Historical places
 Jianning, the former name of Zhuzhou
 Jianning, the former name of Jian'ou